Nebria tatrica is a species of ground beetle in the Nebriinae subfamily that can be found in Poland Czech Republic and Slovakia.

Subspecies
The species have 4 subspecies:
Nebria tatrica dumbirensis Pulpan, 1957
Nebria tatrica fatrensis Hurka & Pulpan, 1992
Nebria tatrica komareki Hurka & Pulpan, 1992
Nebria tatrica tatrica L. Miller, 1859

References

External links
Nebria tatrica at Fauna Europaea

tatrica
Beetles described in 1859
Beetles of Europe
Endemic fauna of Slovakia